Józef Lassota is a Polish politician who served as mayor of Kraków from 1992 to 1998.

References 

1943 births
Living people
People from Rzeszów County
Mayors of Kraków
20th-century Polish politicians
21st-century Polish politicians
Civic Platform politicians